Palmyra Peak is a  mountain summit located in San Miguel County of southwest Colorado, United States. It is situated four miles south of the town of Telluride, on land managed by Uncompahgre National Forest. It is part of the San Juan Mountains which are a subset of the Rocky Mountains, and is west of the Continental Divide. It is immediately south of Telluride Ski Resort, from which it is a prominent landmark, and Palmyra has the distinction of having the highest inbounds skiing terrain of any North American ski resort. The mountain's name has been officially adopted by the United States Board on Geographic Names in association with the Palmyra Mine, a gold and silver mine located at an elevation of 11,650-feet on the peak's western aspect. Other mines on its flanks included Lakeview Mine, Mountain Quail Mine, Roy Johnston mine, and Turkey Creek Mine.

Climate 
According to the Köppen climate classification system, Palmyra Peak is located in an alpine subarctic climate zone with cold, snowy winters, and cool to warm summers. Due to its altitude, it receives precipitation all year, as snow in winter, and as thunderstorms in summer, with a dry period in late spring. Precipitation runoff from the mountain drains into Bear Creek and Prospect Creek which are both tributaries of the San Miguel River.

See also

Gallery

References

External links 
 Weather forecast: Palmyra Peak
 Palmyra Peak (left) and Silver Mountain (right) photo: Flickr

Mountains of San Miguel County, Colorado
San Juan Mountains (Colorado)
Mountains of Colorado
North American 4000 m summits
Uncompahgre National Forest